The Oporelu Canal is an artificial canal built along the right bank dyke of the Arcești Lake on the river Olt in Romania. Its role is to intercept the right bank tributaries of the Olt river and to convey them downstream of the Arcești Dam. The Oporelu canal is registered as an artificial river in the Romania's official registry of rivers.

References

Canals in Romania
COporelu Canal